National Education Mission (Samagra Shiksha Abhiyan) was launched in 2018. Samagra Shiksha is an overarching programme for the school education sector extending from pre-school to class 12. The scheme has been prepared with the broader goal of improving school effectiveness measured in terms of equal opportunities for schooling and equitable learning outcomes. The mission comprises four schemes viz. Saakshar Bharat, Sarva Shiksha Abhiyan, Rashtriya Madhyamik Shiksha Abhiyan and Centrally Sponsored Scheme on Teacher Education (CSSTE). In 2021, the NIPUN Bharat Mission was launched as part of Samagra Shiksha Abhiyan to ensure that universal acquisition of foundational literacy and numeracy skills for all children in India by Grade 3.

In the 2023-24 Union Budget presented on February 1, 2023, the Samagra Shiksha Abhiyan was allocated an amount of Rs 37453.47 crore, the largest allocation within the brackets of the Ministry of Education.

Saakshar Bharat 
Saakshar Bharat is a government of India initiative launched by Prime Minister Manmohan Singh to create a literate society through a variety of teaching–learning programmes for the non-literate and neo-literate of 15 years and above. It was launched on 8 September 2009 as a centrally sponsored scheme. It aims to recast India's National Literacy Mission to focus on the literacy of women, which is expected to increase the literate population by 70 million adults, including 60 million women.
 It is a scheme from Department of School Education, Ministry of Education, Government of India. The National Literacy Mission covered 597 districts under the Total Literacy Campaign, 485 districts under Post Literacy Programme and 328 districts under Continuing Education Programme. As per the 2001 census, over 127 million adults have been made literate of whom 60% were women, 23% were SC and 12% were ST. 
 The Saakshar Bharat Mission has chosen six villages for 'Model Adult Education Centres' under Lok Shiksha Samiti in the Karimnagar district, in Telangana state.

The National Literacy Mission (NLM) is a nationwide program started by Government of India in 1988 with the approval of the Cabinet as an independent and autonomous wing of the Ministry of HRD (the then Department of Education). It aims to educate 80 million adults in the age group of 15–35 over an eighty-year period. By "literacy", the NLM means not only learning how to read, write and count but also helping people understand why they are deprived and helping them move towards change. In India, 81% of youths from ages 15–24 and 63% of all adults are literate, based on a 2005–2010 UNESCO study.

NIPUN Bharat Mission (National Initiative for Proficiency in Reading with Understanding and Numeracy) 

Ministry of Education has launched a National Initiative for Proficiency in Reading with Understanding and Numeracy (NIPUN Bharat), for ensuring that every child in the country necessarily attains foundational literacy and numeracy (FLN) by the end of Grade 3, by 2026–27.The mission will focus on children of age group of 3 to 9 years including pre-school to Grade 3. The children who are in Class 4 and 5 and have not attained the foundational skills will be provided individual teacher guidance and support, peer support and age appropriate and supplementary graded learning materials to acquire the necessary competencies. The estimated budget for the NIPUN Bharat Mission is Rs 2,688 crores for FY21-22. A policy focus on Foundational Literacy and Numeracy has proven to be transformative for developing nations such as Brazil, Kenya, South Africa and Philippines through the launch of programs and missions specifically focusing on increasing the Foundational Literacy and Numeracy levels of primary school children.

The NIPUN Bharat Mission declares the national targets in achieving the requisite learning outcomes, including the year wise outcomes which are to be achieved by each State/ UT by 2026-27. These are called ‘Lakshyas’ and they are defined for each level from the Balvatika to Grade 3 in a progressive manner. States and Union Territories are the critical implementation agents of the mission. Some of the activities which the State will be required to do include creating multi-year action plans to achieve their respective targets, contextualization of national mission, ensuring availability of teachers and teaching-learning material, training and capacity building of all stakeholders including parents, community etc. to make them understand the desired level of learning outcomes etc. States such as Uttar Pradesh, Madhya Pradesh, West Bengal, Bihar, Tamil Nadu, Assam, and Haryana have also launched their respective State Foundational Literacy and Numeracy Missions based on the framework of NIPUN Bharat.

Learning Losses in India 
As of 2022, India has near-universal enrollment of children in schools, at the Elementary Level. However, the quality of education in Indian schools was said to be 'poor'; evidence suggests that the learning levels of elementary-school children in India are low. over 70% of Grade 3 children in India were unable to do basic reading or subtraction, according to the Annual Status of Education Report (ASER) 2018. According to the World Bank's Learning Poverty Brief for India, over 55% of ten-year-old children in India could not read and understand a simple, age-appropriate text in their home language. During the COVID-19 pandemic, India was one of the countries with the longest school closures, pegged at over 69+ weeks. A study by Azim Premji University in 2020 to assess the learning losses of children suggested that over 92% of children surveyed have lost at least one specific language ability, and 82% of children have lost at least one specific mathematical ability. The 2022 iteration of ASER suggests the learning losses have further aggravated during the two years of the pandemic; over 80% of Grade 3 children in India could not read an age-appropriate text and over 75% of children conduct basic mathematical operations.

Framework of the NIPUN Bharat Mission 

The NIPUN Bharat Mission categorizes the expected learning outcomes into three primary developmental goals, namely (i) Children to maintain good health and well-being, (ii) Children to become effective communicators, and (iii) Children to become evolved learners and connect with their environment.

Foundational Learning Study 2022 (FLS 2022) 
The Foundational Learning Study 2022 (FLS 2022) is a study which has been carried out jointly by the Ministry of Education in March 2022. This study is meant to serve as the baseline for the implementation of the NIPUN Bharat Mission. The FLS 2022 is the one of the largest ever studies to assess the foundational level of school children in India, with a sample size of 86,000 students across grade III, V, VIII and X across 10,000 schools. It is also the first-ever study to benchmark Oral Reading Fluency (ORF) and Numeracy on the basis of the UN Global Proficiency Framework.

Foundational Learning in India's G20 Presidency 
'Foundational Literacy and Numeracy, especially in the context of blended learning' has been recognized by the Ministry of Education as one of the four key pillars of Education Working Group for India's G20 Presidency in 2023. This has been recognized as an opportunity to showcase all of the good work and success stories in the NIPUN Bharat Mission and Foundational Literacy and Numeracy in India.

References

Education in India
Indian missions